Bickë is a community in the Korçë County, Albania. It is part of the municipality Maliq.

References

Populated places in Maliq
Villages in Korçë County